He Comes Up Smiling is a 1918 American comedy film produced by and starring Douglas Fairbanks and directed by Allan Dwan.

This film was based on a novel of the same title by Charles Sherman, which was adapted into a 1914 play of the same name by Byron Ongley and Emil Nyitray. Fairbanks starred in the play with Patricia Collinge as the female lead. This film "survives incomplete".

Plot
As described in a film magazine, the principal duty of bank clerk Jerry Martin is to care for the bank president's pet canary. The bird escapes and Jerry starts in pursuit. In a chase that takes him far afield, Jerry meets a hobo and decides to give up his bank job. Baron Bean (Montana), another hobo, becomes his valet, but they desert Jerry when he is taking a bath and steal his clothes. He finds a suit belonging to William Batchelor (MacQuarrie), a broker who is cooling off at a pool, and with the broker's business cards he passes himself off as Batchelor. He meets John Bartlett (Campeau) and his daughter Billie (Daw) and promptly falls in love. Her father is also a stock broker who has been nicked by Batchelor. An attempt is made to corner the market while Jerry is being entertained, but he foils the plotters, falls heir to a fortune, and wins the love of Billie.

Cast
Douglas Fairbanks as Jerry Martin
Marjorie Daw as Billie Bartlett
Herbert Standing as Mike
Frank Campeau as John Bartlett
Bull Montana as Baron Bean
Albert MacQuarrie as William Batchelor
Kathleen Kirkham as Louise
Jay Dwiggins as General
William Elmer 
Robert Cain

Preservation
The surviving reels of He Comes Up Smiling were preserved by the Academy Film Archive in 2010.

References

External links

He Comes Up Smiling at silentera.com
Lobby poster
Sherman, Charles (1912), He Comes Up Smiling, Toronto: McLeod & Allen, on the Internet Archive

1918 films
American silent feature films
Films based on American novels
American films based on plays
Films directed by Allan Dwan
Films based on multiple works
1918 comedy films
American black-and-white films
Silent American comedy films
1910s American films